Novo Selo, meaning "new village" in several Slavic languages, may refer to the following places:

In Albania
Novoselë, a municipality in the Vlorë District
Novoselë, Kolonjë, a municipality in the Kolonjë District

In Austria
 Novo Selo, Croatian name for Neudorf bei Parndorf, a place in Burgenland

In Bosnia and Herzegovina
 Novo Selo (Brod), a village near Brod
 Novo Selo, Bijeljina, a village near Bijeljina
 Novo Selo, Bosanski Brod, a village near Bosanski Brod
 Novo Selo (Šamac), a village near Bosanski Šamac
 Novo Selo, Donji Vakuf, a village near Donji Vakuf
 Novo Selo (Gradiška), a village near Gradiška
 Novo Selo (Kupres), a village near Kupres
 Novo Selo, Bosnia and Herzegovina, formerly called Balegovac, a village near Odžak
 Novo Selo, Prnjavor, a village near Prnjavor
 Novo Selo (Sokolac), a village near Sokolac
 Novo Selo, Tešanj, a village near Tešanj
 Novo Selo, Zenica, a village near Zenica
 Novo Selo, Zvornik, a village near Zvornik

In Bulgaria
 Novo Selo, Kyustendil Province, Kyustendil Province
 Novo Selo, Plovdiv Province, Plovdiv Province
 Novo Selo, Ruse Province, Ruse Province
 Novo Selo, Sliven Province, Sliven Province, presently uninhabited, part of the Novo Selo military training range
 Novo Selo, Sofia Province, Sofia Province
 Novo Selo, Stara Zagora Province, Stara Zagora Province
 Novo Selo, Veliko Tarnovo Province, Veliko Tarnovo Province
 Novo Selo, Vidin Province, seat of Novo Selo municipality, Vidin Province
 the former village of Novo Selo, today a quarter of Apriltsi, Lovech Province

Former name
 Blagoevo, Razgrad Province, Razgrad Province (until 1878)
 Blagovo, Montana Province, Montana Province (until 1949)
 Dalgopol, Varna Province (until 1934)
 Dragomirovo, Pernik Province, Pernik Province (until 1950)
 Dolno Pole, Haskovo Province (1906-1960)
 Gorno Selo, Sofia Province (until 1961)
 Mramor, Haskovo Province, Haskovo Province (until 1950)
 Ruzhitsa, Yambol Province, Yambol Province (until 1934)

Similar names
 Dolno Novo Selo, Sofia Province
 Dolno Novo Selo, Stara Zagora Province
 Gorno Novo Selo, Stara Zagora Province
 Gorsko Novo Selo, Veliko Tarnovo Province
 Novosel, Shumen Province
 Novoselets, Sliven Province
 Novoselishte, Kardzhali Province
 Novoseltsi, Vidin Province
 Novoselyane, Kyustendil Province

In Croatia
 Novo Selo, Brač, a village near Selca
 Novo Selo, Bjelovar-Bilogora County, a village near Čazma
 Novo Selo, Karlovac County, a village near Slunj
 Novo Selo, Požega-Slavonia County, a village near Požega, Požega-Slavonia County
 Novo Selo, Sisak-Moslavina County, a village near Sisak, Sisak-Moslavina County
 Novo Selo, Zagreb County, a village near Vrbovec, Zagreb County
 Novo Selo Bosiljevsko, a village near Bosiljevo
 Novo Selo Garešničko, a village near Berek
 Novo Selo Glinsko, a village near Glina
 Novo Selo Koreničko, a village near Plitvička Jezera
 Novo Selo Lasinjsko, a village near Lasinja
 Novo Selo Okićko, a village near Klinča Sela
 Novo Selo Palanječko, a village near Sisak, Sisak-Moslavina County
 Novo Selo Perjasičko, a village near Barilović
 Novo Selo Podravsko, a village near Mali Bukovec
 Novo Selo Rok, a village near Čakovec, Međimurje County
 Novo Selo na Dravi, a village near Čakovec, Međimurje County
 Novo Selo Žumberačko, a village near Samobor, Zagreb County
 Donje Novo Selo, Croatia, a village near Nijemci, Vukovar-Syrmia County
 Ličko Novo Selo, a village near Đurđenovac
 Našičko Novo Selo, a village near Đurđenovac
 Vinkovačko Novo Selo, a former village now neighbourhood of Vinkovci

In Greece
Plevroma, formerly Novo Selo
Krithia, Thessaloniki, formerly Novo Selo
Neochorouda, was also known as Novo Selo
Agia Paraskevi, Thessaloniki, was also known as Novo Selo

In Kosovo
 Camp Novo Selo, military NATO camp in Novo Selo near Vučitrn, see Swisscoy
 Novo Selo (Kosovska Kamenica), a village in Kosovska Kamenica
 Novo Selo (Peć), a village in Peć
 Novo Selo (Prizren), a village in Prizren
 Novo Selo (Skenderaj), a village in Skenderaj
 Novo Selo (Vitina), a village in Vitina
 Novo Selo (Vučitrn), a village in Vučitrn

In Montenegro
 Novo Selo, Danilovgrad, a village in Danilovgrad Municipality

In North Macedonia
 Novo Selo, Debarca, a village in Debarca municipality
 Novo Selo, Demir Hisar, a village in Demir Hisar municipality
 Novo Selo, Čaška, a village in Čaška municipality
 Novo Selo, Gjorče Petrov, a town in Gjorče Petrov Municipality
 Novo Selo, Mavrovo and Rostuša, a village in Municipality of Mavrovo and Rostuša
 Novo Selo, Kočani, a village in Kočani municipality
 Novo Selo, Kumanovo, a village in Kumanovo municipality
 Novo Selo Municipality, a municipality in eastern North Macedonia
 Novo Selo, Novo Selo, a village in Novo Selo municipality
 Novo Selo, Štip, a village in Štip municipality
 Novo Selo, Struga, a village in Struga municipality
 Novo Selo, Kičevo, a village in Kičevo municipality
 Novo Selo, Veles, a village in Veles municipality
 Novo Selo, Zelenikovo, a village in Zelenikovo municipality
 Novo Selo, Želino, a village in Želino municipality
 Novo Selo, Bogovinje, a village in Bogovinje Municipality

In Serbia
 Bačko Novo Selo, in northern Serbia, in the municipality of Bač
 Banatsko Novo Selo, in northern Serbia, in the municipality of Pančevo
 Novo Selo (Kanjiža), a village in northern Serbia, in the municipality of Kanjiža
 Novo Selo (Raška), a village in Raška municipality, Raška District
 Novo Selo (Surdulica), a village in Surdulica municipality, Pčinja District
 Novo Selo (Trgovište), a village in Trgovište municipality, Pčinja District
 Novo Selo (Vladimirci), a village in Vladimirci, Mačva District
 Novo Selo (Loznica), a village in Loznica
 Novo Selo (Velika Plana), a village in Velika Plana, Podunavski District
 Novo Selo (Sokobanja), a village in Sokobanja
 Novo Selo (Vrnjačka Banja), a village in Vrnjačka Banja, Raška District
 Novo Selo (Raška), a village in Raška District
 Novo Selo (Gadžin Han), a village in Gadžin Han, Nišava District
 Novo Selo (Kuršumlija), a village in Kuršumlija
 Novo Selo (Prokuplje), a village in Prokuplje
 Novo Selo (Bela Palanka), a village in Bela Palanka, Pirot District
 Novo Selo (Lebane), a village in Lebane
 Novo Selo (Leskovac), a village in Leskovac
 Novo Selo (Surdulica), a village in Surdulica
 Deveti Maj (old name Novo Selo), a village in Palilula, Niš

In Slovakia
 Devinsko Novo Selo, former name of Devínska Nová Ves, a borough of Bratislava

See also
 Staro Selo (disambiguation)
 Nova Sela (disambiguation)